American International Medical University (AIMU) is an offshore medical school located on the Caribbean island of St. Lucia. It operates a School of Medicine and a School of Nursing. It partners with universities and hospitals in the United States including Washington Adventist University (WAU) in Takoma Park, Maryland for independent support programs and offers joint classes with WAU for the AIM-U Premedical Science Program on the WAU campus. Future AIM-U programs on the WAU campus may include BSN Completion and Introduction to Clinical Science, as well as the opportunity for AIM-U students to complete the WAU MBA program.

American International Medical University located in Saint Lucia, AIM-U's curriculum and academic programs are prepared and monitored by Members / Specialists of Medical Councils, including Medical School Accreditation Approval and Monitoring Committee, ECFMG.

Accreditation
Accreditation for the school is being considered by the Caribbean Accreditation Authority for Education in Medicine and other Health Professions.

American International Medical University is listed in the FAIMER International Medical Education Directory (IMED) effective in 2007 with school ID #F0002364 and in the World Health Organization's World Directory of Medical Schools. By virtue of its listing in IMED, students graduating from AAIMS are authorized to take part in the United States Medical Licensing Examination three-part examinations. Those who pass the examinations are eligible according to the Educational Commission for Foreign Medical Graduates to register for and participate in the National Resident Matching Program (NRMP).

References

External links

Universities and colleges in Saint Lucia
Nursing schools in Saint Lucia
Medical schools in the Caribbean
2007 establishments in Saint Lucia
Educational institutions established in 2007